Jørn Lauenborg (born 14 September 1944) is a Danish long-distance runner. He competed in the marathon at the 1980 Summer Olympics.

References

1944 births
Living people
Athletes (track and field) at the 1972 Summer Olympics
Athletes (track and field) at the 1980 Summer Olympics
Danish male long-distance runners
Danish male marathon runners
Olympic athletes of Denmark
Sportspeople from Odense